City Hospital may refer to:

 City Hospital, Aberdeen, Scotland
 City Hospital, Birmingham, West Midlands, England
 City Hospital (Roosevelt Island, New York)
 Saskatoon City Hospital
 City Hospital (Martinsburg)
 City Hospital (Hisar), Hisar, India
 City Hospital (Jabalpur), Jabalpur, India
 City Hospital (Kochi), Kochi, India
 City Hospital (Shimoga), Shimoga, India
 City Hospital Gujranwala, Gujranwala, Pakistan
 City Hospital (Gujrat), Gujrat, Pakistan

Television
 City Hospital (UK TV series)
 City Hospital (U.S. TV series)